Live: No Time for Tuning is the first live album by Sloppy Seconds. It was released in 1996 on Triple X Records, and was recorded at The Emerson Theater in their hometown Indianapolis, Indiana.

Track listing
 "I Don't Wanna Be a Homosexual"
 "Mighty Heroes"
 "Come Back, Traci"
 "Human Waste"
 "Veronica"
 "Horror Of Party Beach"
 "Men"
 "Lynchtown U.S.A."
 "Your Sister"
 "Steal Your Beer"
 "I Can't Slow Down"
 "Candy Man"
 "Pop My Dick Song"
 "Queen of Outer Space"
 "I Want 'em Dead"
 "Take You Home"
 "Ice Cream Man"
 "So Fucked Up"
 "Germany"
 "Kids Are All Drunk"
 "Runnin' from the C.I.A."
 "Sorry, Dude"

Credits
 B.A. – vocals
 Steve Sloppy – drums
 Ace Hardware – guitar
 Bo'Ba Jam – bass
 Paul Mahern – engineer, mixing
 Mike Kreffel – artwork, illustrations
 Andy Berry AKA JIMM CALIGULA – producer
 Scott Crays, "sorry dude"

References

1996 live albums
Sloppy Seconds albums